IBM RealThings is a software interface design methodology proposed by IBM in 1998. Instead of using traditional computer-based elements, RealThings proposes that images of physical real-life objects are used instead. This was aimed to be more "natural and intuitive, allowing users to focus more on their tasks and less on computer artefacts".

As a demonstration IBM created RealPhone, RealCD and RealBook.

There were some indications that the examples chosen did not faithfully represent things in real life.

See also
 Microsoft Bob
 Skeuomorph

References

IBM software